Jürgen Jost (born 9 June 1956) is a German mathematician specializing in geometry. He has been a director of the Max Planck Institute for Mathematics in the Sciences in Leipzig since 1996.

Life and work 
In 1975, he began studying mathematics, physics, economics and philosophy. In 1980 he received a Dr. rer. nat. from the University of Bonn under the supervision of Stefan Hildebrandt. In 1984 he was at the University of Bonn for the habilitation. After his habilitation, he was at the Ruhr University Bochum, the chair of Mathematics X, Analysis. During this time he was the coordinator of the project "Stochastic Analysis and systems with infinitely many degrees of freedom" July 1987 to December 1996.

For this work he received the 1993 Gottfried Wilhelm Leibniz Prize, awarded by the Deutsche Forschungsgemeinschaft.

Since 1996, he has been director and scientific member at the Max Planck Institute for Mathematics in the Sciences in Leipzig. After more than 10 years of work in Bochum, this he followed: "tackle new research problems in the border area between mathematics and the natural sciences and simultaneously encourage mathematical research in Germany, particularly in the fields of geometry and analysis."

In 1998 he was an honorary professor at the University of Leipzig. In 2002, there, he initiated with two other scientists from the Max Planck Institute, the Interdisciplinary Center for Bioinformatics (IZBI).

In 1986 he was invited speaker at the International Congress of Mathematicians in Berkeley (Two dimensional geometric variational problems). He is a fellow of the American Mathematical Society.

His research focuses are:
Complex dynamical systems
Neural networks
Cognitive structures and theoretical neurobiology, cognitive science, theoretical and mathematical biology
Riemannian geometry; analysis and geometry
Calculus of variations and partial differential equations; mathematical physics

Bibliography 
 
 
 
 
 
 
 
 
 
 
 
 
Bosonic Strings: A mathematical treatment, AMS international press, 2001

References

External links 
 Webpage at Max-Planck-Institut
 Interview with Jürgen Jost and Dr. Hans-Joachim Freund

20th-century German mathematicians
Fellows of the American Mathematical Society
Mathematical analysts
Variational analysts
Living people
1956 births
University of Bonn alumni
Academic staff of Ruhr University Bochum
21st-century German mathematicians
Max Planck Institutes researchers
Max Planck Institute directors